is a Japanese TV program broadcast on NHK General TV which had been broadcast since 2007 until 2009.

Introduction 
This program is about the human body.
This program started on 2006 as a segment on Bangumi Tamago, hosted by Yumiko Udō, an announcer of NHK, and Lasa-R Ishii. It started regular broadcasting, hosted by Taichi Kokubun and Yuka Kubota, an announcer of NHK Shizuoka (Kubota transferred to Tokyo in March 2008), on April 14, 2007. Two comedians present information about the human body and professors support their presentation and also explain it. The audiences judge which presentation is easy to understand or interesting. The broadcasting finished on March 13, 2009.

Cast 
 Taichi Kokubun - Host
 Yuka Kubota - NHK announcer
 Gekidan Hitori - presenter
 Kirin (Hiroshi Tamura and Akira Kawashima) - presenter
 Penalty (Hideki Nakagawa and Yasuhito Wakita) - presenter
 Takanori Takeyama - presenter
 Kunihiro Matsumura - presenter
 Dachō Club - (Ryuhei Ueshima, Jimon Terakado, and Katsuhiro Higo)- presenter
 Hanamaru-Daikichi Hakata - presenter

Narrator 
 Aya Hirano - she appeared on this show as a guest on August 4, 11, November 24, and December 29.

Music 
 Tanin no Kankei (instrumental, original sung by Katsuko Kanai)

NHK original programming
2007 Japanese television series debuts
2009 Japanese television series endings